Gilmerton railway station served the suburb of Gilmerton, historically in Edinburghshire and Midlothian, Scotland, from 1874 to 1959 on the Edinburgh, Loanhead and Roslin Railway.

History 
The station was opened on 23 July 1874 by the Edinburgh, Loanhead and Roslin Railway. It was situated on the east side of Station Road. On the platform was the station building, which had a booking office and a waiting room. It closed as a wartime economy measure on 1 January 1917, although workmen's trains continued to call here, but reopened on 2 June 1919. To the south of. To the south of the platform was a signal box which controlled access to the goods yard, which had two sidings. Both of them served a goods dock. Passenger numbers steadily decreased over the years and the station closed to passengers on 1 May 1933 but it remained open for goods traffic until 1 July 1959. The platform and station building were demolished in 1976 and the two sidings were lifted in 1978.

References 

Disused railway stations in Edinburgh
Railway stations in Great Britain opened in 1874
Railway stations in Great Britain closed in 1933
1874 establishments in Scotland
1959 disestablishments in Scotland